Julia Alboredo (born 12 January 1997) is a Brazilian chess player. She was awarded the title of Woman International Master in 2022. Alboredo is the 2020 Brazilian women's champion.

Chess career

She has represented Brazil in the Chess Olympiad:
 In 2016, scoring 4/9 on board two.
 In 2018, scoring 4½/10 on board two.
 In 2022, scoring 7/11 on board one.

She qualified for the Women's Chess World Cup 2021 after finishing second in the Brazilian Chess Championship after winner Juliana Sayumi Terao declined the invitation. She was defeated 1½-½ in the first round by Jolanta Zawadzka.

See also
 List of female chess players

References

External links
 
 
 

1997 births
Living people
Brazilian female chess players
Chess Olympiad competitors
Chess Woman FIDE Masters